Bruno Zach (6 May 1891 – 20 February 1935) was an Austrian art deco sculptor of Ukrainian birth who worked in the early-to-mid 20th century. His output included a wide repertoire of genre subjects, however he is best known for his erotic sculptures of young women.

Early life
Bruno Zach was born in Zhytomyr, Ukraine, on 6 May 1891. He emigrated to Austria as a young man and studied at the Vienna Academy under sculptors Hans Bitterlich (1860–1949) and Josef Müllner (1879–1968). His styles ranged from art deco, art nouveau, sporting, to orientalism. His oeuvre would generally be considered decorative if not for his success in producing erotic sculpture.

Career
Zach became a prolific creator of sculptures featuring tall, athletic, dominating women in bronze and ivory, the combination of the two in art casting sometimes being referred to as “chryselephantine”. He most often signed as "B. Zach" or "Bruno Zach", however a number of his pieces were signed with his pseudonyms, being "Prof. Tuch", "Professor Tuch" or "K. Salat".  His erotica sculptures usually featured sexy, dreamy, scantily clad mistresses in stockings, garters, and high heels.

One of his better known sculptures is the sado-masochistic The Riding Crop. Original period castings of this sculpture have sold for as much as $151,849, one such sale having taken place at the Bonhams auction house in Knightsbridge on 23 November 2011. According to Bonhams' director of decorative arts, Mark Oliver, "the demand for his work just grows and grows".

One of Zach's more controversial sculptures, created circa 1930, was his extremely erotic piece entitled The Hugger. The sculpture depicts a woman hugging a larger-than-life penis. Zach frequently portrayed the seedy side of nightlife in Berlin with many of his sculptures which often featured prostitutes.

His bronze sculptures were generally fired and coated with chemical patinas in mid-brown colors but were sometimes cold painted or polychromed. His used ivory, sparingly, and it was generally well carved. Zach's work was edited by several firms, including Argentor-Werke (Vienna), Broma Companie, S. Altmann and Company, and Franz Bergmann.

Death
Zach died in Vienna, Austria, on 20 February 1935.

References

Literature
 Davenport's Art Reference & Price Guide, 2007/2008 Edition – .
 Romeo and Juliet in Zhytomyr words, 2016 - 
 Житомирська сторінка кохання скульптора Бруно Зака -

Notes

Austrian sculptors
Austrian male sculptors
Art Deco sculptors
1891 births
1935 deaths
Artists from Zhytomyr
People from Volhynian Governorate
Emigrants from the Russian Empire to Austria-Hungary
20th-century sculptors
Fetish artists
Ukrainian male sculptors